Nanochilus is a genus of plants in the ginger family. It contains only one known species, Nanochilus palembanicus, endemic to Sumatra.

References

Endemic flora of Sumatra
Zingiberoideae
Zingiberaceae genera
Monotypic Zingiberales genera